The 1971–72 Spartan League season was the 54th in the history of Spartan League. The league consisted of 16 teams.

League table

The division featured 16 teams, 14 from last season and 2 new teams:
 Farnham Town, from Surrey Senior League
 Harefield United, from Middlesex League

References

1971–72
9